The Homs school bombing occurred on 1 October 2014 in Homs, Syria in an Alawite majority neighborhood during the Syrian civil war. The attacker initially detonated an IED that was in front of the Akrama al-Makhzumi Al-Muhdatha elementary school. Then he blew himself up at another gate of a nearby school, Akrama al-Makhzumi. The double bombing killed 54 people: 47 children, 3 members of security forces and 4 adult civilians. The attack was the deadliest strike to occur in a government controlled area in over a year, with no group immediately taking responsibility.

Public Protests 
Following the bombing, several protests broke out because of the government's failure to prevent the attack. Although most protestors where reportedly pro-government, many called for the removal of Iyad Ghazal who was the provincial governor for the Homs Governorate. Iyad, who at the time was largely unpopular with the people, was eventually removed from office. Protests began to turn anti-government when Syrian security forces fired on a group of protestors.

International Reactions 
The Syrian Foreign Ministry sent letters to the United Nations and Security Council, in which they accused the so-called "moderate armed opposition" of planning and executing the attacks. However, the members of the Security Council, Secretary-General Ban Ki-moon and Special Representative Leila Zerrougui all condemned the attack against civilians including children.

In addition, the British Minister for the Middle East Tobias Ellwood mentioned: "I condemn recent attacks in Syria targeting civilians. These have included the bombing of a school in Homs, the continued use of indiscriminate barrel bombs by the Assad regime in Aleppo province, and the siege around Kobane. Such attacks underline the dreadful toll that the conflict continues to take on the Syrian people and we call on all parties to end the deliberate targeting of civilians. The UK will continue to press for those responsible for such attacks to be held accountable and to press for a political solution to bring to an end the suffering of the Syrian people."

Notes

References

2014 murders in Syria
21st-century mass murder in Syria
Attacks on buildings and structures in 2014
Attacks on buildings and structures in Syria
School bombing
Elementary school killings
School bombing
School bombing
Mass murder in 2014
Massacres of the Syrian civil war in 2014
October 2014 crimes in Asia
October 2014 events in Syria
School bombings
School massacres in Asia
Suicide bombings in 2014
Suicide bombings in Syria
Terrorist incidents in Syria in 2014